Gagay: Prinsesa ng Brownout is a 1993 Philippine comedy film directed by Bey Vito. The film stars Gelli de Belen as the title role. It was one of the entries in the 1993 Manila Film Festival. It also marks the film debut of Charina Scott and Raffy Rodriguez.

The film is streaming online on YouTube.

Cast
 Gelli de Belen as Gagay / Ringga
 Janno Gibbs as John
 Anjo Yllana as Paul
 Rustom Padilla as Raul
 Raffy Rodriguez as George
 Maritoni Fernandez as Brenda
 Tessie Tomas as Aling Timang
 Jaime Garchitorena as Brando
 Zeny Zabala as Aling Huling
 Leo Martinez as Don Leon
 Jinky Oda as Jezebel
 Charina Scott as Madonna
 Archi Adamos as Junior Elvis
 Moody Diaz as Aling Iska
 Kuya Cesar as Priest
 Errol Dionisio as Hepe
 Lou Veloso as Roderick
 Lady Guy as Ate Guy
 Bobby Henson as Kuya Ronnie
 Tita Pambid as Lucring
 Marie Barbacui as Mare
 Myra Cuesta as Lilibeth

References

External links

Full Movie on Viva Films

1993 films
1993 comedy films
Filipino-language films
Philippine comedy films
Viva Films films